Don Oakes may refer to:

 Don Oakes (American football) (born 1938), American football player
 Don Oakes (footballer) (1928–1977), English footballer